Lord Dismiss Us is a 1967 novel by Michael Campbell, that deals with issues of homosexuality in an English boys' public school.

Plot summary
The novel is set in a public school in England in the 1960s. It deals with the love affair between two boys, together with the internal politics of the school itself. Carleton, a sixth former loves Allen, a boy two years his junior. At the same time, the headmaster is trying to enforce a policy against such liaisons.

Historical context
The novel is set firmly in the era in which it was written. It appeared in the same year that homosexuality between consenting adults was legalised in the UK.

Adaptations
In 2017, Taggart creator Glenn Chandler adapted the novel into a play for the Edinburgh Festival Fringe, to mark the 50th Anniversary of the partial legalisation of homosexuality in England and Wales. The play received positive reviews, and subsequently transferred to the Above The Stag Theatre in London later that year. The play was once again reviewed positively, and received four Off West End Award nominations, including "Best Production" and "Best New Play".

Author
The author, Michael Mussen Campbell (1924–1984) was the grandson of the 1st Lord Glenavy and brother of the 3rd Baron, the humorist Patrick Campbell. He was a Dubliner who attended St Columba's College and Trinity College. Lord Dismiss Us was allegedly based on the suicide of a St Columba's schoolmaster.

Briefly a barrister at the Irish Bar, Campbell worked in London for the Irish Times. His other novels included Peter Perry (1956), a "story of Dublin Theatrical Life", Oh Mary, This London (1959), a fantasy set in London, and Across the Water (1959).

Michael Campbell succeeded his brother Patrick in 1980 to become the 4th and last Baron Glenavy. He died in 1984, having never married.

References

1967 British novels
British LGBT novels
Heinemann (publisher) books
Novels set in schools
1960s LGBT novels
Novels with gay themes